Lipceni is a village in Rezina District, Moldova.

References

Communes of Rezina District